Rühner See is a lake in the Rostock district in Mecklenburg-Vorpommern, Germany. At an elevation of 2.8 m, its surface area is 1.01 km².

External links 
 

Lakes of Mecklenburg-Western Pomerania